Parco Emilio Alessandrini is a memorial park in Milan, Italy, dedicated to Emilio Alessandrini, an Italian judge, assassinated by Prima Linea in 1979. It covers an area of 6.65 ha (66.500 m²).

Parks in Milan